Yakob Aníbal Mosa Shmes (born 6 April 1967) is a Chilean entrepreneur who served from as the president of Blanco y Negro S.A. board concessionaire that manages the Club Social y Deportivo Colo-Colo.

Biography
In late 2010, Mosa bought a 12,5% stake in Blanco y Negro after acquiring the titles auctioned by then freshly elected President Sebastián Piñera.

Political views
He is openly progressivist. His parents Assisi Meuse and Amal Schmes were members of the Baath Arab Socialist Party. In August 2019, he declared his admiration for former President Michelle Bachelet, whom he described as a «heritage of Chilean democracy».

References

External links
 

1967 births
Living people
Chilean people of Syrian descent
Presidents of Blanco y Negro S.A.